Jaru (also Romanized as Jārū) is a village in Jaru Rural District of Palangabad District, Eshtehard County, Alborz province, Iran. At the 2006 census, its population was 602 in 156 households. At the most recent census in 2016, the population of the village had increased to 766 in 254 households; it is the largest village in its rural district.

References 

Eshtehard County

Populated places in Alborz Province

Populated places in Eshtehard County